Alphablocks is a British animated television programme for preschoolers that debuted on CBeebies on 25 January 2010. The programme was created by Joe Elliot and produced by Alphablocks Ltd (Magic Lantern in series 1) with Blue Zoo. It was commissioned by the British Broadcasting Corporation. The show follows the Alphablocks, block characters who represent each letter of the alphabet. They live in Alphaland and embark on adventures relating to word concepts.

List of episodes

Series 1 (2010–2011) 

 Alphablocks (letters and their sounds)
 Bee (letter E)
 Top (B_G)
 Why (Y as a vowel)
 Key (letters C and K)
 Glow (short vowels O and U; OW making the long O sound)
 Sing (B_ND)
 Band (AB word family)
 Party (letters S and X)
 Race (making words with the alphabet)
 Cha cha cha (introduction to digraphs)
 Moon (digraph OO)
 Alphalympics (anagramming)
 Sail (digraph AI)
 UFO (R-controlled vowels)
 Fox (pangrams)
 Surprise (vowel A)
 Bus (short vowels O and U)
 Space (long vowels A and E)
 Hide (long vowels E and I)
 Quiet (letter Q)
 Map (letter R)
 Jaybird (letter J)
 Note (S-ending plural words)
 Zzzzz (letter Z)
 Magic (long vowels with Magic E)

Series 2 (2012) 

 Taps (short vowel A)
 In (short vowel I)
 Man (letter M)
 Din (short vowels A and I)
 Dog (short vowels I and O)
 Cat (short vowel A)
 Pen (short vowel E)
 Up (short vowel U)
 Red (letter R)
 Hen (letter H)
 Bop (letter B)
 Fred (letter F)
 Hill (double consonants LL, SS, and FF)
 Van (letters J and V)
 Zap (letters Y and Z)
 Dot (short vowel O)
 Lips (short vowels)
 Web (letters W and X)
 Box (ED word family)
 Quick (letter Q)
 Kick (Words with CK endings)
 Wig (IG word family)
 Rainbow (OG word family)
 On (letters and their sounds)
 ABC (the alphabet song)
 The Cat sat on the Mat (AT word family)

Series 3 (2012–2013) 

 Wish (UG word family)
 Snowman (AN word family)
 Win (IN word family)
 Hat (AP word family)
 Little Red N
 Dots
 Frog on a Dog (short vowels I and O)
 Best (letter blend ST)
 Fit (IT word family)
 Odd (short vowel O; nonsense words)
 Champ (digraphs CH and SH)
 Song (digraph NG)
 Thing (digraph TH)
 Train (digraph AI)
 Beep (digraph EE)
 Tightrope (trigraph IGH)
 Toad (digraph OA)
 Book (digraph OO)
 Hey! (vowels A, I, O, and OO)
 Card (digraph AR)
 The End (digraphs OI, OR, and UR)
 How now brown cow (digraph OW)
 Fair (trigraphs AIR, EAR, and URE, and digraph ER)
 Ants (introduction to letter blends)
 Ink (INK word family)
 Crash (short vowel A; onomatopoeic words)

Series 4 (2013) 

 Four (words with ending blends)
 Clap (words with beginning blends)
 Prank (words with beginning and ending blends)
 Plusman (compound words)
 Alphabet (digraphs WH and PH)
 Name (long vowel A)
 Sleep (long vowel E)
 Mine (long vowel I)
 Home (long vowel O)
 Blue (long vowel U, and digraph EW)
 Outlaw (words with AW and AU)
 Birthday Girl (digraph IR)
 Cowboy (digraphs OY and OU)

Specials (2021) 

 Band Together (making words with letters appearing in alphabetical order)
 The Wonderful Wizard of Az (changing vowels in CVC words)
 Boo! (vowels A, O, and OO)
 Letters to Santa (Christmas vocabulary)

Alphablocks & Numberblocks Specials (2022)
 Making Friends
 Crossover (the A1-Z26 cipher)
 The Case of the Missing Blocks (word magic with 2 words)
 The Blocks v Blocks Games (anagrams)

Alphablocks: Word Magic 
Alphablocks: Word Magic is a spin-off of Alphablocks.

Alphablocks: Word Magic is a series of 26 short episodes published all at the same time on BBC iPlayer in 2020, making the Alphablocks return after 7 years of no episodes, although these episodes tend to recap all of the letters from A to Z.

Each and every episode will begin with the letter doing something, with the narrator describing it. After that, three words will be spelled with that letter, and a little scene will play that has something to do with that word. After the words, the same Alphablock animation will play a second time. There are 26 episodes, one for each letter in the alphabet.

The episodes last for 1–3 minutes.

References

External links 
 
 
  Home page in the Learningblocks website

2010 British television series debuts
2022 British television series endings
2010s British children's television series
BBC children's television shows
British computer-animated television series
British preschool education television series
English-language television shows
CBeebies
Animated preschool education television series
2010s preschool education television series